Metoxypilus costalis is a species of praying mantis in the family Nanomantidae.

References

See also
 List of mantis genera and species

Nanomantidae
Insects described in 1889